FC Spartaki Tbilisi is a Georgian football club based in Tbilisi. They currently play at the third highest level, Meore Liga's Centre Zone. They play their home games at Shevardeni Stadium.

Previous names 
 1946—1947: Krylya Sovetov Tbilisi
 1948—198?: Spartak Tbilisi
 2002—2003: Spartaki Tbilisi
 2003—2004: Spartaki-Lazika Zugdidi
 2004—...: Spartaki Tbilisi

Notable players
 Teymuraz Mchedlishvili

External links 
 Statistics by Footballfacts (USSR)
 Statistics by Footballfacts (Georgia)
 Profile on WeltFussballArchiv 

Spartaki Tbilisi
Spartaki Tbilisi
Association football clubs established in 1946
Association football clubs established in 2002
2002 establishments in Georgia (country)
Soviet Top League clubs